Kathleen Mavourneen is a 1930 American pre-Code sound/talking film directed by Albert Ray, stars Sally O'Neil and produced and distributed by Tiffany Pictures, and is the first talking film version of the oft-filmed Dion Boucicault play.

The last version prior to this film was a 1919 silent Fox film starring Theda Bara. Sally O'Neil would star in the 1937 all-Irish version of the story, thereby filming the story twice.

The film's sets were designed by the art director Hervey Libbert. Prints of the film are held by the Library of Congress.

Cast
Sally O'Neil as Kathleen O'Connor
Charles Delaney as Terry
Robert Elliott as Dan Moriarty
Aggie Herring as Aunt Nora Shannon
Walter Perry as Uncle Mike Shannon
Francis Ford as James, The Butler

other
Dannie Mac Grant – uncredited
Donald Novis – Singer

References

External links
Kathleen Mavourneen @ IMDb.com

1930 films
Tiffany Pictures films
American films based on plays
Films directed by Albert Ray
1930 romantic drama films
American romantic drama films
American black-and-white films
1930s English-language films
1930s American films